Omar Gatlato  is a 1976 Algerian drama film directed by Merzak Allouache. It was entered into the 10th Moscow International Film Festival where it won the Silver Prize.

Plot
Omar is a young and lively, rather macho Algerian who holds a good job in the Department of Frauds and lives in a crowded apartment with his sisters, his mother and grandparents. He loves to listen to chaabi music and Indian music, to party with his friends, and to dream about women. A friend of his gives him a tape; when he listens to it, he is fascinated by the woman's voice. That same friend arranges for him to meet the woman, who is totally different from what he had imagined on hearing her voice.

References

External links

 

1976 films
1976 drama films
1970s Arabic-language films
1970s French-language films
Films directed by Merzak Allouache
Algerian drama films